Haliplus robertsi is a species of crawling water beetle in the family Haliplidae.

References

Further reading

 
 

Haliplidae
Articles created by Qbugbot
Beetles described in 1924